2018 Alaska earthquake may refer to:

 2018 Gulf of Alaska earthquake, on January 23
 2018 Anchorage earthquake, on November 30